Leandro Maly (born ) is a former Argentine male volleyball player AND POLÍTICO. He was part of the Argentina men's national volleyball team. He competed with the national team at the 2000 Summer Olympics in Sydney, Australia, finishing 4th.

See also
 Argentina at the 2000 Summer Olympics

References

External links
 profile at sports-reference.com

1976 births
Living people
Argentine men's volleyball players
Place of birth missing (living people)
Volleyball players at the 1996 Summer Olympics
Volleyball players at the 2000 Summer Olympics
Olympic volleyball players of Argentina